What Livin's All About is the third studio album by American country music artist Rhett Akins. It was released in 1998 on MCA Nashville. The album accounted for two singles: "More Than Everything" and "Better Than It Used to Be", which respectively reached #41 and #47 on the Billboard country singles charts. It was also his only release for MCA. The track "I'll Be Right Here Lovin' You" was later released as a single by Randy Travis from his 1999 album A Man Ain't Made of Stone.

Track listing

Personnel
Rhett Akins- acoustic guitar, lead vocals
Eddie Bayers- drums
Mike Brignardello- bass guitar
Larry Byrom- acoustic guitar
J.T. Corenflos- electric guitar
Stuart Duncan- fiddle
Paul Franklin- steel guitar
Sonny Garrish- steel guitar
Brent Mason- electric guitar
Steve Nathan- piano
Michael Rhodes- bass guitar
Matt Rollings- piano
Russell Terrell- background vocals
Kent Wells- electric guitar
Curtis Young- background vocals

Chart performance

References

1998 albums
Rhett Akins albums
MCA Records albums
Albums produced by James Stroud